Shanghai High School is a top public high school in Shanghai, China. It also has an international division, the Shanghai High School International Division. In a 2016 ranking of Chinese high schools that send students to study in American universities, Shanghai High School ranked number 3 in mainland China in terms of the number of students entering top American universities.

Location and campuses
The campus is located on 989 Baise Road, Xuhui District, Shanghai, China. The campus covers 340 mu or about 56 acres.

Its junior department was separated to Shanghai Huayu Private School (）in 1999.  Shanghai High School's sister school in Hong Kong is the St. Paul's Co-educational College.

History
The school was established in 1865 (originally named Longmen Academy 龍門書院). Its name was changed to Jiangsu Shanghai High School in 1927, and it was renamed as Shanghai High School in 1950.

During World War II, the school's buildings were used by the Japanese as a prison camp, Lunghua Civilian Assembly Center. An exhibition of the school's unique history can be seen in the school's art building exhibition center.

In June 1993, Shanghai High School became the first Chinese school to start an international division. In 1995, Shanghai High School International Division became the first in China to offer an International Baccalaureate program. More than 1750 students from the United States, Japan, Korea, Canada, England, Italy, Germany, Australia, Yugoslavia, Iran, Egypt, Venezuela, Hong Kong, Macau, and Taiwan represent just some of the fifty plus countries and regions represented at Shanghai High School International Division. In 2005, 37.5% graduates entered top 20 universities in the US.

In 2003, Shanghai High School became a UNESCO associated school. That October, it became the first "Shanghai Municipal Demonstration School."

Administration

Principals
Tang, Shouqian (汤寿潜)
Yang, Xianjiang (杨贤江)
Ou, Yuanhuai (欧元怀)
Zheng, Tonghe (郑通和)
Wang, Shikan (王士侃)
Wu, Ruinian (吴瑞年)
Shen, Yizhen (沈亦珍)
Sun, Fuxi (孙福熙)
Chen, Guangzu (陈光祖)
Ye, Keping (叶克平)
Bai, Zaili (白宰理)
Fang, Qi'ao (方启敖)
Tang, Shengchang (唐盛昌)
Feng, Zhigang (冯志刚, current principal)

International division
The international division of Shanghai High School, SHSID currently enrolls over 3000 students. It is known for its reputation as an International Baccalaureate World School and often scores above the world averages. In its recent history, it has also implemented AP courses and tests, as well as school-only SAT reasoning and subject testing centers. Teaching materials are based upon Taiwanese/Hong Kong or American teaching curriculum with midterm and final testing on a semester basis.

Academics

Olympiad prize winners
The Shanghai High School puts much emphasis on education of winners in Olympiad competitions. For those who won gold medals on the international and national levels, the school awards them "summa cum laude". These students' transcripts are attractive to prestigious US colleges like MIT and Stanford.

Mathematics class 
Since 1990, Shanghai High School has set up, at each level of age, a Mathematics class.  Within these classes are students who are both interested in and very good at Mathematics (or other science subjects like Physics and Chemistry). The curriculum are special for students of Mathematics class, which biases strongly to subjects like Mathematics. Also, the pacing of teaching is very fast comparing to the norm.

The current principal, Mr. Feng, Zhigang, was/is also one of the Mathematics teachers of the Mathematics classes.

Innovation class

Engineering class

College application 
Each year about 400 students graduate from Shanghai High School Local Division. Over 99% of the graduating class enter the rank one undergraduate(Chinese: 一类本科). Over 60% of the graduating class enter top national universities, such as Peking University, Tsinghua University, Shanghai Jiao Tong University, Fudan University and University of Hong Kong. Around 15% of the student body get admitted to renowned colleges in US, UK and Japan, including Harvard University, Stanford University, Wharton School of the University of Pennsylvania, Massachusetts Institute of Technology, and University of Cambridge. Of the students who have taken SAT tests, the average score of each class ranges from 2100 to 2200 (out of 2400), with the majority of them scoring over 2200.

Alumni
Over the years, Shanghai High School has had many notable alumni, including over 100 provincial level or higher leaders, 29 People's Liberation Army generals, and 51 Chinese Academy of Science members.

In the last five years, 95% of the graduates of Shanghai High School have attended the most elite universities in China. In 2006, this percentage increased to 99%. Of those students, 65% attended either Peking University, Tsinghua University, Fudan University or Shanghai Jiaotong University.

Notable alumni:
Zeng Qinghong (曾庆红): Vice President of the People's Republic of China (2003－2008)
Li Yuanchao (李源潮): Vice President of the People's Republic of China (2013－2018)
Zhu Kaixuan (朱开轩): former Chairman of the State Education Commission of the PRC (1993－1998)
Qian Liren (钱李仁): politician, diplomat, and translator, former head of the People's Daily (1985－1989)
Jin Yongjian (金永健): former Under-Secretary-General of the United Nations (1996－2001)
Jiang Yiren (蒋以任): Chairman of Shanghai CPPCC (2003－2008)
Ye Gongqi (叶公琦): Chairman of Shanghai Municipal People's Congress (1988－1998)
An Wang (王安): computer engineer, co-founder of Wang Laboratories
Liu Yizheng (柳詒徵, teaching staff): historian
Lu Simian (呂思勉, teaching staff): historian
Ye Qisun (叶企荪): physicist
Zhou Mingzhen (周明镇): paleomammalogist and vertebrate paleontologist
Wu-Chung Hsiang (項武忠): mathematician
Theodore Yao-tsu Wu (吴耀祖): engineer
Wu Shuqing (吴树青): economist, president of Peking University (1989－1996)
Ching-Lai Sheng (盛慶琜): president of National Chiao Tung University (1972－1978)
Tsi-an Hsia (夏濟安): scholar, elder brother of C. T. Hsia
Liu Dalin (刘达临): sociologist and sexologist
Ni Kuang (倪匡): novelist and screenwriter
Zhou Guoping (周国平): writer, philosopher
Cao Xihua (曹锡华): Mathematician
Gu Hailiang (顾海良): economist, president of Wuhan University
Charles Chao (曹国伟): businessman, president and CEO of Sina Corp
Chen Tiemei, archaeologist

References

External links
Shanghai High School Official site 
Shanghai High School Official site 

Schools in Shanghai
High schools in Shanghai
International Baccalaureate schools in China
Educational institutions established in 1865
1865 establishments in China